Solidarity unionism is a model of labour organizing in which the workers themselves formulate strategy and take action against the company directly without mediation from government or paid union representatives.  It is a key pillar of anarcho-syndicalism. Organizations which use the model of solidarity unionism, such as the Industrial Workers of the World, state that putting power directly into the hands of the workers prevents an otherwise inevitable crust of bureaucrats from forming within the organization.  This is why organizations which use the solidarity unionism model often refer to other sorts of labour organizing as bureaucratic unionism.

Notes

See also

Anarcho-syndicalism

Industrial Workers of the World
Employee relations
Trade unions in the United States
Syndicalism